Omorgus rimulosus is a species of hide beetle in the subfamily Omorginae and subgenus Afromorgus.

References

rimulosus
Beetles described in 1957